Beckianum sinistrum is a species of air-breathing land snails, terrestrial pulmonate gastropod mollusk in the family Achatinidae.

Distribution 
Distribution of this species include:
 Costa Rica
 Nicaragua

References

Subulininae
Gastropods described in 1898
Taxonomy articles created by Polbot